Nikolaos Andriakopoulos (1878 in Patras – after 1896) was a Greek gymnast. He was a member of Panachaikos Gymnastikos Syllogos, that merged in 1923 with Gymnastiki Etaireia Patron to become Panachaiki Gymnastiki Enosi.

Olympics performances
Andriakopoulos competed at the 1896 Summer Olympics, Athens, in the rope climbing event. He and countryman Thomas Xenakis were the only two out of the five entrants to climb all the way to the top of the 14 meter rope. Andriakopoulos finished in 23.4 seconds, defeating Xenakis to claim the gold medal. This would be the last Greek gold medal in gymnastics until Ioannis Melissanidis won gold in the floor exercise in 1996.

He also entered the team parallel bars event. In that competition, Andriakopoulos was a member of the Panellinios Gymnastikos Syllogos team that placed second in the event, giving him an Olympic silver medal.

References

External links

1878 births
Gymnasts at the 1896 Summer Olympics
19th-century sportsmen
Greek male artistic gymnasts
Olympic gold medalists for Greece
Olympic silver medalists for Greece
Olympic gymnasts of Greece
Year of death missing
Olympic medalists in gymnastics
Sportspeople from Patras
Medalists at the 1896 Summer Olympics
Date of birth missing
Place of death missing